Christina Foggie (born March 5, 1992, in Voorhees Township, New Jersey) is an American professional basketball player, who was drafted in 2014 by the Minnesota Lynx of the WNBA.

Foggie grew up in Mount Laurel, New Jersey and attended Lenape High School, where her 2,137 career points scored of any basketball player in school history, male or female.

Vanderbilt statistics

Source

References

External links
WNBA Rookie Profile
USA Basketball profile

1992 births
Living people
American women's basketball players
Basketball players from New Jersey
Guards (basketball)
Lenape High School alumni
Minnesota Lynx draft picks
People from Mount Laurel, New Jersey
People from Voorhees Township, New Jersey
Sportspeople from Burlington County, New Jersey
Sportspeople from Camden County, New Jersey
Vanderbilt Commodores women's basketball players